Bouray-sur-Juine (literally Bouray on Juine) is a commune in the Essonne department in Île-de-France in northern France.

History

The town name is coming from lord Pierre de Bouray in 13th century and Louis de Rabondanges in 16th century, both owner of the Château of Mesnil-Voisin (rebuilt in 17th century).

Geography
It is 38 kilometers south west of Paris Notre Dame point zero from road of France, 16 kilometers south west of Évry, 14 kilometers north east of Étampes  5 kilometers north west of La Ferté-Alais, 9 kilometers south east of Arpajon, 14 kilometers south east of Montlhéry, 16 kilometers south west of Corbeil-Essonnes, 18 kilometers south east of Milly-la-Forêt, 20 kilometers south east of Dourdan, 22 kilometers south east of Palaiseau.

Transports and way links

Bouray train station, is located in the commune of Lardy, it is served by RER C.
Bus from CEAT is taking care of the link between Bouray-sur-Juine, Janville-sur-Juine, Arpajon, Saint-Vrain, Itteville, Marolles-en-Hurepoix et Étampes.
The Noctilien is stopping there as well.
The village lies on the right bank of the Juine, which forms all of the commune's northern border.

Inhabitants of Bouray-sur-Juine are known as Bouraysiens.

See also
Communes of the Essonne department

References

External links

Official website 

Mayors of Essonne Association 

Communes of Essonne